Pablo Sinues (also published as Pablo Martinez-Lozano Sinues) is an associate professor at the Department of Biomedical Engineering at the University of Basel (Basel, Switzerland) and lecturer at the Department of Chemistry and Applied Biosciences at ETH Zürich. He received his Ph.D. in Mechanical Engineering from the Charles III University of Madrid (Spain) and Habilitation in Analytical Chemistry at ETH Zürich. Sinues heads the Translational Breath Research group located at the University Children’s Hospital Basel

Academic activity

Sinues has pioneered  Secondary electrospray ionization with a focus in  Breath gas analysis applications. He co-authored over 50 peer-reviewed articles covering fields ranging from engineering to medicine. He is President of the Society of Spanish Researchers in Switzerland (ACECH)  and Vice-president of the Swiss Metabolomics Society (SMS). He also serves as an expert for InnoSuisse, the Swiss Innovation Agency 
Sinues is principal investigator of the Research Network Zurich Exhalomics, which is an initiative by scientists from the Zurich area with the goal to provide technical solutions for the rapid and sensitive on-line analysis of breath. He is co-inventor of five patents and winner of the 2020 SGMS award. He co-founded  the start-up company 'Deep Breath Initiative (DBI)' to uncover the full potential of Molecular Breath Analysis to advance precision medicine and make it available for general health care.

References

Outreach Activities 
   Martínez-Lozano et al., J Am Soc Mass Spectrom 2009, 20, 1060-63 
   Martinez-Lozano Sinues et al., PLoS ONE 2013, 8  
  BBC News 
  ETH news (30/1/2016)
 Swiss national television (2/2/2016; in Italian)

External links
 Deep Breath Initiative
 Sinueslab
 ACECH
 Zurich Exhalomics

Year of birth missing (living people)
Living people
21st-century Spanish scientists
Mass spectrometrists